= IBM's The Great Mind Challenge =

Software development competition

The Great Mind Challenge (TGMC) is an annual nationwide software development competition, created by the Academic Initiative of IBM. The competition currently takes place in India, Israel, China, Ireland and Switzerland. Outside of India, the effort is known as the IBM Great Minds Program.

The Academic Initiative programs include various student and university engagements designed to encourage innovation in the technology space at the university level and to enable students to become market-ready.
